The  doubles Tournament at the 2007 Internationaux de Strasbourg took place between 21 and 26 May on the outdoor clay courts of the Centre Sportif de Hautepierre in Strasbourg, France. Yan Zi and Zheng Jie won the title, defeating Alicia Molik and Sun Tiantian in the final.

Seeds

Draw

References
 Main Draw

2007 Doubles
Internationaux de Strasbourg - Doubles
2007 in French tennis